Riccardo Niccolini (born 4 July 1958) is an Italian wrestler. He competed in the men's freestyle 74 kg at the 1980 Summer Olympics.

References

1958 births
Living people
Italian male sport wrestlers
Olympic wrestlers of Italy
Wrestlers at the 1980 Summer Olympics
Sportspeople from Livorno